Myrmica winterae is a species of ant in the genus Myrmica. It is native to Switzerland.

References

Myrmica
Fauna of Switzerland
Insects described in 1973
Hymenoptera of Europe
Taxonomy articles created by Polbot